Queen of Montreuil is a 2012 French comedy-drama film directed by Sólveig Anspach and starring Florence Loiret Caille.

Cast 
 Florence Loiret Caille as Agathe
 Didda Jónsdóttir as Anna
 Úlfur Ægisson as Úlfur
 Éric Caruso as Caruso
 Samir Guesmi as Samir
 Alexandre Steiger as Alexandre
 François Tarot as Ludovic
 Anne Morin as Virginie
 Zakariya Gouram as Selim Loubna
 Bernard Bloch as The foreman
 Sophie Quinton as Laurent's mistress

Accolades
The film won the Lina Mangiacapre Award at the 69th Venice International Film Festival and the Audience Award at the Reykjavík International Film Festival.

References

External links 
 

2012 films
2012 comedy-drama films
2010s French-language films
2010s Icelandic-language films
French comedy-drama films
Films directed by Sólveig Anspach
2010s English-language films
2012 multilingual films
French multilingual films
2010s French films